City Union Bank Limited is an Indian private sector bank headquartered in Kumbakonam, Tamil Nadu. The bank was initially named Kumbakonam Bank Limited, and was incorporated on 31 October 1904. The bank preferred the role of a regional bank in the Thanjavur district of Tamil Nadu.

History
The City Union Bank Limited was originally incorporated under the name Kumbakonam Bank as a limited company on 31 October 1904. The bank preferred a regional role and adopted an agency model in the initial years. The first branch was opened in 1930. In 1987, the name of the bank was changed to City Union Bank.

See also

 Banking in India
 List of banks in India
 Reserve Bank of India
 Indian Financial System Code
 List of largest banks
 List of companies of India
 Make in India

References
 

Private sector banks in India
Banks established in 1904
Companies based in Tamil Nadu
Companies based in Thanjavur
Indian companies established in 1904
Companies listed on the National Stock Exchange of India
Companies listed on the Bombay Stock Exchange